

Players

Competitions

Division Three

League table

Results summary

League position by match

Matches

FA Cup

League Cup

Appearances and goals

References

Books

1967-68
Northampton Town